Akbarpur is a city, municipal corporation, tehsil, and the administrative headquarters of Ambedkar Nagar district in the state of Uttar Pradesh, India. It is a part of Ayodhya division.

Mythology 
According to the Ramayana, Akbarpur is where King Dashratha shot Dhanush Shravan Kumar, at the place called Shravan Kshetra. The ashram of the sage Shringi Rishi was situated here. According to the Ramayana, Rama's son Kusha rules Shravasti. The Rajbhar King rules its eastern part. In the Ramayana Rama battled with many Rajbhar kings.

Geography 
Akbarpur, is situated on the banks of the Tamsa River (also known as the Tons River). The Tamasa River divides the city of Ambedkarnagar into two parts, Akbarpur and Shahzadpur, with the latter being the commercial centre of the city. Lorepur, part of Akbarpur City, is noted as the location of the old palace and imambargah of Lorepur.

Demographics 
As of 2011 Indian Census, Akbarpur had a total population of 111,447, of which 57,330 were males and 54,117 were females. Population within the age group of 0 to 6 years was 14,726. The total number of literates in Akbarpur was 72,049, which constituted 64.6% of the population with male literacy of 70.9% and female literacy of 58.1%. The effective literacy rate of 7+ population of Akbarpur was 74.5%, of which male literacy rate was 81.7% and female literacy rate was 66.9%. The Scheduled Castes and Scheduled Tribes population was 15,310 and 50 respectively. Akbarpur had 17720 households in 2011.

Administration 

Akbarpur city is governed by a municipal corporation.

Economy 
Major economic activities in the district are power looms and farming. Agricultural industries include rice milling and power and distribution transformer manufacturing. The district is noted for Tanda Terricot clothes based in nearby Tanda. Many rice mills are present in Akbarpur. There is a cement manufacturing plant, the Jaypee Ayoudha Grinding Unit, which belongs to the Jaypee Group. The district has a thermal power station belonging to NTPC Limited.

Transport

By road 
Akbarpur is well connected with the nearby cities of Faizabad, Ayodhya, Lucknow, Sultanpur, Raebareli, Amethi, Azamgarh, Jaunpur, Varanasi, Prayagraj, Pratapgarh; and with the nearby towns of Tanda, Baskhari, Maharua, Dostpur, Bhiti, Hanswar, Haiderganj, Jalalpur, Goshainganj, Tarun, and Bikapur.

The Purvanchal Expressway connects Akbarpur to the capital, New Delhi, via the Agra-Lucknow and Yamuna expressways.

By rail 
Akbarpur Junction is the main railway station in Akbarpur city. Goshainganj, Faizabad Junction, Ayodhya Junction, Lucknow Junction, Shahganj Junction and Varanasi Junction are nearby railway stations.

By air 
Ayodhya Airport (Ayodhya), Chaudhary Charan Singh International Airport (Lucknow), Gorakhpur Airport (Gorakhpur), and Lal Bahadur Shastri International Airport (Varanasi) are the nearby airports.

Education 
The recent establishment of various local colleges has improved the availability of higher education. The Ramabai Government Women Post Graduate College, Akbarpur, was established in 1997 to provide opportunities in various disciplines to rural, as well as urban, students. BNKBPG College is a privately managed and government-aided co-educational degree college that offers several programs. There is one government engineering college, Mahamaya Engineering College, a medical college, and a recently opened agriculture college.
 
Many government secondary schools (junior high schools and Rajkiya intermediate colleges) have been opened in town to provide educational opportunities. St. Peter's Inter College is an ICSE-accredited English medium inter college founded in 1984, and it celebrated 25 years of existence in 2009. Radiant college is a CBSE-accredited college in Jalalpur. Narendra Dev Intermediate College is accredited to the U.P. board.

Engineering colleges 
 Rajkiya Engineering College, Ambedkar Nagar a government Engineering college in Akbarpur, Ambedkar Nagar. It is affiliated to Dr. A.P.J. Abdul Kalam Technical University of Lucknow.
 Mahamaya College of Agricultural Engineering and Technology is a government agriculture engineering college in Akbarpur. It is part of Faizabad's Narendra Dev University of Agriculture and Technology.

Medical college 
 Mahamaya Rajkiya Allopathic Medical College, A government medical college in Akbarpur, Ambedkar Nagar

Religious sites 

A popular pilgrimage site is the Hindu temple of Shiv Baba. A fair is held here every Monday and Friday.

Notable people

 Arunima Sinha, first Indian woman amputee to climb Mount Everest
 Syed Amin Ashraf
 Syed Waheed Ashraf
 Syeda Ummehani Ashraf
 Ram Manohar Lohia, Indian freedom fighter and socialist political leader.
 Neem Karoli Baba, spiritual saint
 Abdur-Razzaq Nurul-Ain
 Ashraf Jahangir Semnani

See also

References

Cities and towns in Ambedkar Nagar district
Cities in Uttar Pradesh
Akbarpur, Ambedkar Nagar